Four Continents is the collective name of four sculptures by Daniel Chester French, installed outside the Alexander Hamilton U.S. Custom House at Bowling Green in Manhattan, New York City. French performed the commissions with associate Adolph A. Weinman.

Description and history
The work was made of marble and sculpted by the Piccirilli Brothers, with each sculptural group costing $13,500. The sculptures were first shown to the public in 1905. From east to west, the statues depict larger-than-life-size personifications of Asia, America, Europe, and Africa. The primary figures are female, but there are also auxiliary human figures flanking each primary figure. In addition, Asia's figure is paired with a tiger, and Africa's figure is paired with a lion.

Gallery

References

External links

 
 The Four Continents at Waymarking: Africa, America, Asia, Europe

Allegorical sculptures in New York City
Bowling Green (New York City)
Financial District, Manhattan
Marble sculptures in the United States
Outdoor sculptures in Manhattan
Sculptures by Daniel Chester French
Sculptures carved by the Piccirilli Brothers
Sculptures of lions
Sculptures of women in New York City
Statues in New York City
Tigers in art
Personifications of continents
Skulls in art